Johannes Härteis (born 22 February 1996) is a German tennis player.

Härteis achieved a career high ATP singles ranking of world No. 300 in November 2020.

He made his ATP main draw debut at the 2019 Hamburg European Open in the doubles competition, partnering Daniel Altmaier.

Challenger and Futures finals

Singles: 2 (0–2)

References

External links

1996 births
Living people
German male tennis players
Sportspeople from Nuremberg
Tennis people from Bavaria